Krizziah Lyn Tabora (born March 17, 1991) is a Filipino bowler who represents the Philippines in international bowling competitions.

Career
Tabora competed at the 2016 Asian Intercity Bowling Championship in Jakarta, Indonesia. She along with Lara Posadas won a silver medal the women's double event. The two along with two other bowlers, Anne Marie Kiac and Maria Lourdes Arles, won a gold medal at the women's team event for the Philippines besting the teams from Singapore and China which won silver and bronze respectively.

At the 2017 Southeast Asian Games, Tabora, Posadas with Marie Alexis Sy, Dyan Coronacion and Maria Liza Del Rosario won a bronze at the women's team of five event. All five save for Coronacion also won the bronze in the same event for the 2015 edition.

The Philippine team of four for the 2017 Asian Indoor and Martial Arts Games which consisted of Tabora, Posadas, Sy and Del Rosario, settled for the silver medal after they lost to South Korea in the final.

Tabora became the women's champion in the 2017 QubicaAMF Bowling World Cup after she secured a 236-191 victory over Siti Safiyah of Malaysia in the final. She is the fifth bowler representing the Philippines to win at the Bowling World Cup and her title is the eight for the Philippines overall.

References

1991 births
Filipino ten-pin bowling players
Bowlers at the 2014 Asian Games
Bowlers at the 2010 Asian Games
Living people
Southeast Asian Games bronze medalists for the Philippines
Southeast Asian Games medalists in bowling
Competitors at the 2017 Southeast Asian Games
Competitors at the 2015 Southeast Asian Games
Asian Games competitors for the Philippines